Chilate is a drink prepared with cocoa, rice, cinnamon and sugar. It is originally from Ayutla de los Libres, Guerrero, México. Chilate is served cold and usually accompanied with buñuelos. 

Atolli or "maize drink" in Nahuatl, is the base for chilate.

This drink is served very cold.

Variations 
There's another drink in southern Mexico (state of Guerrero) also known as chilate, prepared with cocoa, rice, corn (sometimes served with cookies), cinnamon and piloncillo (cooked sugar cane juice).

Chilate is a drink native to Central America, prepared from chile, roasted corn and cocoa and is usually that add anise, pepper, ginger and cinnamon. The chilate is served hot and is taken with typical sweets like dulce de camote, dulce de platano or nuegados in El Salvador.

In Oaxaca, Mexico, chilate is a typical dish the region that is a type of broth made with chicken.

Drinks
Central American cuisine